Sevier Lake  is an intermittent and endorheic lake which lies in the lowest part of the Sevier Desert, Millard County, Utah. Like Great Salt Lake and Utah Lake, it is a remnant of Pleistocene Lake Bonneville.  Sevier Lake is fed primarily by the Beaver and Sevier rivers, and the additional inflow is from the lake's watershed that is part of the Escalante–Sevier hydrologic subregion.  The lake has been mostly dry throughout recorded history and is a source of wind-blown dust.

History
In January 1880, the lake was nearly dry and had been so for the past one or two years. The Sevier River, which once flowed to the lake, is now largely diverted for irrigation. In 1987 however, the lake was again similar to the recorded description of 1872.

The Domínguez–Escalante expedition named it "Laguna de Miera" after Bernardo de Miera y Pacheco, a cartographer on their 1776 expedition.  In 1825, trappers working for William Henry Ashley trapped the region, and Jedediah Smith named it after him, the Ashley Lake.  On some maps, it was named after Joseph Nicollet in the mid-19th century.  The lake is currently named for the river, which is derived from "Río Severo" (wild river [Wild in modern Spanish is Salvaje or Silvestre]), a local name given by early Spanish explorers.

Water
In late 2011, due to an unusually wet year, many man-made reservoirs in Millard County began dumping excess water through the Sevier River onto the Sevier Lake bed. Standing water existed on the playa for the first time since 1984 and extended down past Needle Point, which is the feature seen on the west edge of the lake. In the deepest points, water levels were over three feet deep. Due to high salinity content, of over 20% TDS, the water never fully froze from the winter temperatures, which were well below , except near the inlet of the Sevier River.

Potash mining
A development-stage potassium sulfate project is being developed on Sevier Dry Lake headed up by Crystal Peak Minerals (CPM). Extensive exploration drilling and other test work have been completed over the entire playa. In 2018, CPM published an NI 43-101 feasibility study (FS) for the production of potassium sulfate. The FS forecasts average annual SOP production over the 30-year life of the Project of approximately 298,000 metric tonnes of potassium sulfate.
The Federal Government approved of the project in August 2019. Over the 30-year life of the project, potash production could reach 372,000 tons a year.

Climate

Gallery

References 

Terminal Lake Systems - Sevier Lake. Utah Water Research Laboratory, Utah State University
Utah History Encyclopedia.
Sevier River Flooding 1983-1984. WaterHistory.org

Endorheic lakes of Utah
Intermittent lakes
Lakes of the Great Basin
Lakes of Millard County, Utah
Great Basin National Heritage Area
Pleistocene United States
Quaternary Utah
Lakes of Utah